TCDD-inducible poly [ADP-ribose] polymerase is an enzyme that in humans is encoded by the TIPARP gene.

See also
 TCDD, or 2,3,7,8-Tetrachlorodibenzodioxin

References

Further reading